Tepa is a village in Wallis and Futuna. It is located in Mua District on the southeastern coast of Wallis Island. Its population according to the 2018 census was 270 people.

References

Populated places in Wallis and Futuna